The Ugraparipṛcchā Sūtra (The inquiry of Ugra) is an early Indian sutra which is particularly important for understanding the beginnings of Mahayana Buddhism. It contains positive references to both the path of the bodhisattva and the path of the arhat, the latter of which was denigrated as a lesser spiritual path in later Mahayana sutras. It also emphasises solitary spiritual practices instead of community-based ones much like the very early Rhinoceros Sutra.

History of the sutra
While no version in an Indo-Aryan language survives, extant versions of the Ugraparipṛcchā Sūtra include three Chinese translations (Taishō Tripiṭaka 322, 12.15a-23a; T 323 12.23a-30c; T 310[10], 11.472b-480b), a Tibetan translation, and a Mongolian translation based on the Tibetan version.

The Ugraparipṛcchā Sūtra was one of the first Buddhist texts to be brought to China and it was apparently very popular as it was translated into Chinese six times between the second and fifth centuries, appearing first as Dharma Mirror sutra translated by An Xuan and Yan Fotiao during the Later Han and then by Dharmarakṣa during the Jin Dynasty. In the Chinese canon it is part of the Ratnakuta collection. It was also widely known in India, being one of the most quoted texts in both the Daśabhūmikā Vibhāṣā (The Great Commentary on the "Ten Stages Sutra" attributed to Nagarjuna) and Shantideva's Śikṣāsamuccaya (8th century).

Jan Nattier has suggested that it is likely the text circulated in Dharmaguptaka circles early in its history.

Content of the sutra
The central themes of the Ugraparipṛcchā Sūtra are the practices of the householder (gṛhin) and those of the bhikṣu (pravrajita) and bhikṣuṇī (pravrajitā), stressing the importance and superiority of the latter group. The sutra promotes the bodhisattva ideal as a difficult, strictly monastic path, taking thousands of lifetimes to complete and suited only for the few. It also does not mention any other central Mahayana doctrines or place its teachings in opposition to what would later be classified as "Śrāvakayāna" teachings. Because of this, scholars such as Jan Nattier believe it dates to an early period in the development of Mahayana Buddhism. 

The position of householder is seen as highly disadvantageous to religious practice in comparison to the life of a pravrajita and householders are urged to ordain as soon as they are able. In the Ugraparipṛcchā Sūtra, the practice of living as a forest (āraṇyaka) bodhisattva is seen as preferable to being a village monk: Even when the bodhisattva enters the towns and cities to preach he must "keep a cave-and-forest mind, as when he dwells in his hermitage."

Contents
Practices of the Lay Bodhisattva 
Opening Salutation 
The Setting 
Ugra's Inquiry
Going for Refuge
The Refuges, Repeated
Good Deeds
The Bodhisattva's Perspective
The Eleven Precepts 
The Bodhisattva in Society 
The Faults of the Household Life 
The Benefits of Giving 
Thoughts When Encountering Beggars 
Detachment from People and Things 
Cultivating Aversion for One's Wife 
Cultivating Detachment from One's Son 
How to Interact with Beggars 
The Triskandhaka Ritual
When Monks Violate the Precepts 
When Visiting a Monastery 
Contrasts between Household and Renunciant Life 
When Visiting a Monastery, Cont'd
The Ordination of Ugra and His Friends (version 1)

Practices of the Monastic Bodhisattva 
The Renunciant Bodhisattva's Practices 
The Four Noble Traditions 
The Noble Traditions and Other Ascetic Practices 
The Virtues of Wilderness-Dwelling 
Interacting with Other Monks and Teachers 
The Pure Morality of the Renunciant Bodhisattva 
The Pure Meditation of the Renunciant Bodhisattva 
The Pure Insight of the Renunciant Bodhisattva
The Ordination of Ugra and His Friends (version 2) 
How the Householder Can Live as a Renunciant 
Dialogue with Ananda 
The Title of the Text 
The Final Reaction of the Audience

See also
 Mahayana sutras

References

Bibliography
 
 
 

Mahayana sutras